Hibbertia glebosa is a species of flowering plant in the family Dilleniaceae and is endemic to South Australia. It is a spreading to low-lying shrub with linear to lance-shaped leaves and yellow flowers arranged singly, with six or seven stamens in a cluster on one side of the two carpels.

Description
There are six or seven stamens in a cluster on one side of the two carpels.

Taxonomy
Hibbertia glebosa was first formally described in 2010 by Hellmut R. Toelken in the Journal of the Adelaide Botanic Gardens from specimens collected by Robert John Bates on Mount Crawford in 1993. The specific epithet (glebosa) means "lumpy", referring to the surface of the outer sepal lobes.

In the same journal, Toelken described two subspecies and the names are accepted by the Australian Plant Census:

Distribution and habitat
This hiibertia grows in open woodland, subspecies glebosa in the Mount Lofty Ranges and subspecies oblonga on the western end of Kangaroo Island, usually near swamps or creeks.

See also
List of Hibbertia species

References

glebosa
Flora of South Australia
Plants described in 2010
Taxa named by Hellmut R. Toelken